Pentalpha is a puzzle where the goal is to place nine stones on the ten intersections of a pentagram. The puzzle is used as a confidence trick in Mexico, where it is known as estrella mágica. The following rules need to be obeyed when placing the stones:
The stone has to visit two other points before reaching its final point.
These three points have to be next to each other.
The points have to be in a straight line.
Although the second (middle) point is allowed to be occupied by a stone, the first (starting) and third (ending) points must be clear before a stone is placed at the third (ending) point.

Solution
The solution to Pentalpha can be found for any starting point using the following algorithm:
Choose a node X.
Travel two nodes in a straight line to node Y.
From node Y, place a stone at node X.
Let node Y be the new node X.
Repeat step 2-4 until the puzzle is solved.

References

Puzzles